Lacrimosa is part of the Dies Irae sequence in the Roman Catholic Requiem Mass.

Lacrimosa or Lacrymosa is the Latin for weeping, and may also refer to:

Religion
 Our Lady of Sorrows, a title given to Mary, mother of Jesus.

Astronomy 
 208 Lacrimosa, a main belt asteroid

Classical music 
 Lacrimosa (Requiem), part of the Dies Irae sequence in the Roman Catholic Requiem Mass
 Lacrimosa, a movement from Grande Messe des morts (or Requiem) by Hector Berlioz
 Lacrimosa, a movement from Requiem in B♭ minor by Antonín Dvořák
 Lacrimosa, a movement from Requiem in D minor by Wolfgang Amadeus Mozart
 Lacrimosa, a movement from Messa da Requiem by Giuseppe Verdi

Popular music 
 Lacrimosa (band), a gothic rock/metal musical duo
 "Lacrymosa" (song), by Evanescence from the album The Open Door, 2006
 "Lacrimosa" (Kalafina song), from the album Red Moon
 "Lacrimosa", a song by Immediate Music from the album Themes for Orchestra and Choir
 "Lacrymosa", a song by Libera from the album Peace
 "Lacrimosa", a song by the Melvins from the album Stag
 "Lacrimosa", a song by Regina Spektor from the album Songs
 "Lacrimosa", a song by Sweetbox from the album Adagio
 "Lacrimosa", a song by Symbion Project from the album Immortal Game
 "Lacrimosa", a song by Symphony X from the album V: The New Mythology Suite
 "Lacrimosa", a song by Tech N9ne from the album Special Effects
 "Lacrimosa", a song by Ufomammut from the album Snailking
 "Lacrimosa", a part of "Requiem" by Welsh composer Karl Jenkins
 "Lacrimosa", a part of "Requiem for My Friend" by Zbigniew Preisner
 "Lacrimosa", a song by Tribulation from the album Down Below
 "Lacrimosa", a song by Apashe from the album Requiem
 "Lacrimosa", a song by Mushroomhead from the album A Wonderful Life
 "Lacrimosa", a song by Gaspard Augé from the album Escapades

Fiction 
 "Lacrimosa", a character in Terry Pratchett's "Discworld" series

Video games 
 Ys VIII: Lacrimosa of Dana